Sepänkylä (Finnish) or Smedsby (Swedish) is a district of Espoo, a city in Finland.

See also
 Districts of Espoo

References 

Districts of Espoo